Shakira in Concert: El Dorado World Tour is the fifth live album by Colombian singer and songwriter Shakira. It was filmed at the Forum in Inglewood, California, where Shakira performed on 28 August 2018, as part of the North American leg of the El Dorado World Tour.

Background and release 

After the tickets of the North American leg of The El Dorado World Tour, which was launched to promote Shakira's eleventh studio album El Dorado (2017), were sold-out, she confirmed footage from the tour would be filmed and released and announced a show to be held at The Forum in Inglewood, California.

On 27 August 2018, Shakira posted a video and then made a survey on her Twitter account about which one of the three Balmain shirts she alternately wore during the first section of the concert would be chosen for a next tour date. The day after that, Hans Nelson, a tour crew member, posted on his Instagram account that indeed the two concerts to be held at The Forum, Los Angeles, California, would be taped for a future live DVD release. On the date of the rescheduled second show in the city, the singer herself confirmed through her social networks that the concert of that day would be recorded for a concert film. Soon after the tour ended, Shakira announced she has started the editing process of the tour DVD.

Promotion
On 8 November 2019, Shakira confirmed the release of a live album on 13 November, along with the live version of "Chantaje" featuring Maluma as the album's lead single.

On November 13 and 15, 2019; a recording of the show in Los Angeles at The Forum was released in selected cinemas around the world.

Critical reception
Nuria Net of Rolling Stone gave the film and live album a positive review calling it Shakira's "Triumphant Return to Singing". Net noted how the film was more directed towards Shakira's return and does not dwell too much on the painful episode of Shakira's vocal-cord hemorrhage injury.

Alex Stölk of Medium also gave the film and live album a positive review stating how Shakira "Shines Once Again".

Awards

The movie received 5 nominations and won 2 awards at the 2020 NY TV Film Awards Shakira won 2 out of 5 awards in 2020.

Commercial performance
According to Pamela Bustios in an article for Billboard, "Shakira In Concert logged 2,000 SEA units, which equates to 2.9 million audio on-demand streams for its songs in its first tracking week." The same article also stated "The live album bows with a little over 2,000 equivalent album units earned in the week ending Nov. 14, according to Nielsen Music. Most of its initial sum stems from streaming activity."

Track listing

Charts

References

2019 live albums
Shakira live albums